The Norman Wells Proven Area Agreement, signed in 1944 by the federal government of Canada and Imperial Oil Limited, grants Imperial Oil the exclusive right and privilege to drill for, mine, win and extract all of the petroleum and natural gas from this field for three terms of 21 years. The Agreement was valid until the year 2008. Norman Wells is on the Mackenzie River in the Northwest Territories.

Under the Proven Area Agreement, Imperial Oil was designated the Operator of the project and given full control of the development and operation of the Proven Area and bears all the yearly up-front costs, charges and expenses incurred with the development and production of the proven area. The Government of Canada receives, as partner in the project, a one-third ownership interest in the gross production from this area.

Economy of the Northwest Territories

1944 documents

Government of Canada
Petroleum industry in Canada
ExxonMobil subsidiaries
History of the Northwest Territories
Mackenzie River
Petroleum production
Natural gas fields in Canada
1944 in the Northwest Territories
1944 in Canada